Toribash is a free-to-play turn-based third-person fighting game created by Singaporean developer Nabi Studios and published by Nicalis, which released on Microsoft Windows in 2006. A port for the Wii was released in July 2010, and for OS X and Linux in May 2014.

Gameplay 
The game is mainly played by manipulating the various joints on the player's doll-like character over turn-based sequences to execute movements. These movements primarily include relaxing, holding, contracting and extending of the player model's neck, pecs, elbows, wrists, abdomen, glutes, hips, knees and ankles; raising and lowering the shoulders, tilting the lumbar and chest left and right, and grabbing and un-grabbing of the hands.

The game features singleplayer and multiplayer, where movements are executed in turn-frames of varying lengths within set match-frames. The game is heavily sand-box based.

Reception 

Toribash has been reviewed by PC Gamer UK, PC Gamer and PC Format, receiving 87%, 68% and 90% respectively.

References

External links 
 

2006 video games
Fighting games
Linux games
MacOS games
WiiWare games
Windows games
Lua (programming language)-scripted video games
Wii games
Freeware games
Multiplayer hotseat games
Steam Greenlight games
Video games developed in Singapore